Sleeping with Charlie Kaufman is a 2010 American short animated comedy film created by J Roland Kelly using Xtranormal.

It held its premiere on June 3, 2010 at the Little Rock Film Festival, where it was one of the contenders for the Charles B. Pierce Award for the best Arkansas-made film, and it was also shown as part of The Rome International Film Festival in Rome, Georgia.

Plot 
In an interview with Xtranormal, J Roland Kelly describes the film as "...basically this absurd, funny conversation between a guy and his girlfriend. He tells her he fantasizes about her twin sister, but she doesn’t have a twin sister, so it’s just another way of fantasizing about her… and is she offended. [It draws on] some La Nouvelle Vague & Mumblecore elements from the kind of films I was watching at the time."

See also
 Surreal humor
 Charlie Kaufman

References

External links 
 
 
 Sleeping with Charlie Kaufman from the Little Rock Film Festival
 Sleeping with Charlie Kaufman at Movies Planet

2010 films
American independent films
American romantic comedy films
American animated short films
2010 animated films
Computer-animated short films
2010s American animated films
2010 short films
2010s English-language films